Canada competed at the 1964 Winter Olympics in Innsbruck, Austria. Canada has competed at every Winter Olympic Games.

Medalists

Alpine skiing

Men

Men's slalom

Women

Bobsleigh

Cross-country skiing

Men

Men's 4 × 10 km relay

Figure skating

Men

Women

Pairs

Ice hockey

First round
Winners (in bold) qualified for the Group A to play for 1st-8th places. Teams, which lost their qualification matches, played in Group B for 9th-16th places.

|}

Medal Round 

Canada 8-0 Switzerland
Canada 3-1 Sweden
Canada 4-2 Germany (UTG)
Canada 8-6 USA
Canada 6-2 Finland
Czechoslovakia 3-1 Canada
USSR 3-2 Canada

Leading scorer

Luge

Men

Ski jumping 

Athletes performed three jumps, the best two were counted and are shown here.

Speed skating

Men

Women

Official Outfitter

HBC was the official outfitter of clothing for members of the Canadian Olympic team.

References

 Olympic Winter Games 1964, full results by sports-reference.com

Nations at the 1964 Winter Olympics
1964
Winter Olympics